The Shadegan International Wetland' is a series of Ramsar wetlands in Khuzestan Province, Iran. The ponds and surrounding marshes are fed by the Karun river and are connected to the Persian Gulf.

The soil surrounding the wetlands is saturated with groundwater and the wetlands themselves are calm and a rich habitat for wildlife. The Shadegan ponds are known for their resort facilities, research areas and the flora and fauna. There is also a flood control system, while the area is crossed by a highway, connecting the city of Shadegan with Darkhovin.

Animal life in the Shadegan ponds include two species of amphibians, five species of reptiles and 154 species of birds, among them pelican and flamingo. The area is also known for its birds of prey and is very important to migratory birds.  There are also 40 species of mammals present, among them the Iranian wolf, river otter, jungle cat and wild boar.

The area suffers from pollution from leaking oil pipes, industrial waste and agricultural fertilisers.
However, the economic dependence and income generated from this wetland is immense, most of values are either ignored or underestimated in policy related decisions.  Given the diversity of social, economic, and environmental benefits that derive from the Shadegan International Wetland, strong opinion exists that people, especially those living around the wetland, are dependent on wetland and gain long-term benefit from this ecosystem. Therefore, one major role of wetland management which is to estimate the value of various aspects of a wetland should not ignored.

References

Marshes of Iran
Ramsar sites in Iran
Landforms of Khuzestan Province